Asterophila is a genus of medium-sized sea snails, marine gastropod mollusks in the family Eulimidae.

Species

There are three known species within the Asterophila genus of gastropods. These include the following:

 Asterophila japonica (Randall & Heath, 1912)
 Asterophila perknasteri (Warén, in Warén & Lewis, 1994)
 Asterophila rathbunasteri (Warén, in Warén & Lewis, 1994)

References

 Warén A. & Lewis L.M. (1994) Two new species of eulimid gastropods endoparasitic in asteroids. The Veliger 37(4):325-335.

External links
 To World Register of Marine Species

Eulimidae